The Albvorlandtunnel is a planned 8,176 m long railwail tunnel for the new Wendlingen–Ulm high-speed railway in Baden-Württemberg. It will underpass a part of the town Kirchheim-Lindorf and Bundesautobahn 8 with junction Kirchheim-East in the industrial area of Dettingen unter Teck
The 8,176 m long building is between kilometer 26,077 and 34,253. It is on the boundary of Wendlingen am Neckar, Kirchheim unter Teck, Lindorf and Dettingen unter Teck. It underpasses motorway 8 (km 32,259 bis ca. 33,9) and also a high pressure gas line and a NATO fuel line.

The tunnel traverses under and through layers of black jura. The biggest superposition is 65 meters, the smallest superposition is 9,50 m. High water pressure is expected.

The call for competition European-wide had 8 bidders. The order has an amount of 380 million € and was given on 18. December 2015 the Swiss company Implenia.

The work should be finished within 46 months.

In a planning paper from the Deutsche Bahn (March 2012) plan approval was expected for 2014, start of work 2014 and end of work in 2021. Spring 2014 the contractor delayed the plan approval to beginning of 2015 and the start to 2016.

Costs
The costs of 270 million € were announced in a newspaper in April 2014 . The Cabinet of Germany said this could be true. In April 2009 the rough costs were calculated by 16,5 million € per kilometer and tube. The total cost of section 2.1 will be 798,7 million € (state 2010).

References

Railway tunnels in Germany
Proposed rail infrastructure in Germany
Railway lines in Baden-Württemberg
High-speed railway lines in Germany